"Some Kind of Monster" is a song by American heavy metal band Metallica from their studio album St. Anger. The song was released as a single on July 13, 2004. "Some Kind of Monster" was Nominated for Grammy Award for Best Hard Rock Performance in 2005 but lost to Velvet Revolver for the song "Slither".

The Metallica documentary of the same name – Metallica: Some Kind of Monster – was released in 2004, and the single appeared in several developing forms on the film's soundtrack, along with other songs.

Information
The name "Some Kind of Monster" came from vocalist/guitarist James Hetfield describing the lyrics to producer Bob Rock being about a Frankenstein creature or "some kind of monster". Thus, it was also used as a title for the 2004 documentary about the recording of St. Anger and the turmoil surrounding it. Hetfield has previously described the entity that is Metallica - the burden of fame and life in general - as monstrous.

The song's birth and development are well detailed in the homonymous documentary as well. It was one of the first songs put together for the album. It would later be released as the final single and music videos of St. Anger, and would be shortened considerably from the album version. The video contains old footage of Metallica concerts as well as a performance of the song in Metallica's San Francisco headquarters which is included in its entirety on the St. Anger DVD. In some regions, such as the US, the EP was bundled with a T-shirt featuring the artwork.

During the "clean" intro, Lars Ulrich's snare drum can be heard rattling in the background.

On the documentary's DVD extras there are a couple of sections entitled "Tough Riff", that show Hetfield teaching one of the song's main riffs to Kirk Hammett, who appeared to have trouble figuring it out.

In popular culture
 A copy of the soundtrack is featured in the Criminal Minds episode called "Extreme Aggressor". The song "Enter Sandman" is also mentioned.
 Dean Winchester, a character from the American TV show Supernatural, is heard humming the song in "Phantom Traveler", the series' fourth episode.

Track listing for soundtrack
All live tracks recorded live on June 11, 2003, in Paris, France.

Personnel
Metallica
James Hetfield – vocals, rhythm guitar
Lars Ulrich – drums
Kirk Hammett – lead guitar
Robert Trujillo – bass (tracks 2-7)

Additional musician
Bob Rock – bass (tracks 1 & 8)

Production, tracks 1 and 8
Produced by Bob Rock and Metallica
Engineered and mixed by Bob Rock, assisted by Mike Gillies and Eric Helmkamp
 Digital engineering by Mike Gillies
Mastered by Vlado Meller
Track 8 remixed by Randy Staub and Bob Rock, remastered by Ted Jensen

Production, tracks 2-7
Recorded and mixed by Mike Gillies
Mastered by George Marino

Packaging
Illustration by Matt Mahurin
Design by Kathleen Philpott

Chart performance

References

Songs about monsters
2003 songs
Metallica songs
Songs written by Bob Rock
Songs written by James Hetfield
Songs written by Kirk Hammett
Songs written by Lars Ulrich
Song recordings produced by Bob Rock
Elektra Records singles